James Wayne "Jim" Silva (born January 15, 1944) is a Republican United States politician who served in the California State Assembly.

A native of Orange County, Silva earned his Bachelor of Arts in Business from San Jose State University and a master's degree from Chapman University.  He was an economics teacher in the Garden Grove Unified School District from 1966 until 1994, when he was elected to the Orange County Board of Supervisors.  Silva holds a real estate broker's license.

Silva served on the Huntington Beach City Council from 1988 until 1994, when he was elected to the Board of Supervisors.  Silva was Mayor of Huntington Beach.  Silva served three terms as a member of the Orange County Board of Supervisors, representing the second district from 1995 to 2006, when he was elected to the State Assembly. 
Silva is a former member of the Orange County Transportation Authority, Orange County Sanitation District, South Coast Air Quality Management District, and LAFCO.

Silva and his wife, Connie, married in 1970. Their son Chad, born 1976, and their daughter, Donna, born 1978, are both officers in the United States Air Force.

References

External links
Official Campaign web site
Join California Jim Silva

1944 births
Living people
Chapman University alumni
Educators from California
Mayors of Huntington Beach, California
Republican Party members of the California State Assembly
Orange County Supervisors
People from Fullerton, California
People from Huntington Beach, California
American real estate brokers
San Jose State University alumni
21st-century American politicians